At various dates in the run up to the 2017 general election, various organisations carried out opinion polling to gauge the opinions that voters hold towards political leaders. Results of such polls are displayed in this article. Most of the polling companies listed are members of the British Polling Council (BPC) and abide by its disclosure rules.

The date range for these opinion polls is from the previous general election, held on 6 May 2015, to the 8 June 2017.

Leadership approval ratings 

YouGov: "Do you view (Insert name here) favourably or unfavourably?"
Ipsos MORI: "Are you satisfied or dissatisfied with the way (Insert name here) is doing his job as Prime Minister/Party leader?"

Theresa May 

The following polls asked about voters' opinions on Theresa May, Leader of the Conservatives and Prime Minister of the United Kingdom.

2017

2016

Jeremy Corbyn 

The following polls asked about voters' opinions on Jeremy Corbyn, Leader of the Labour Party.

2017

2016

2015

Tim Farron 

The following polls asked about voters' opinions on Tim Farron, Leader of the Liberal Democrats.

2017

2016

2015

Paul Nuttall 

The following polls asked about voters' opinions on Paul Nuttall, Leader of the UK Independence Party.

2017

2016

Approval ratings for former party leaders

David Cameron 

The following polls asked about voters' opinions on Theresa May, Leader of the Conservatives and Prime Minister of the United Kingdom.

2016

2015

Harriet Harman 

The following polls asked about voters' opinions on Harriet Harman, interim leader of the Labour Party.

2015

Nigel Farage 

The following polls asked about voters' opinions on Nigel Farage, Leader of the UK Independence Party.

2016

2015

See also 
 Opinion polling for the 2017 United Kingdom general election
 2017 United Kingdom general election

References

Leadership approval opinion polling for United Kingdom general elections